George Cloy is former professional footballer who played his entire 12-year senior career with Dumfries club Queen of the South as a utility player. Cloy also played for Kello Rovers, Threave Rovers, Dalbeattie Star and Crichton.

When later interviewed for the Queens website, Cloy listed Ted McMinn, Allan Ball, Tommy Bryce, Jimmy Robertson and Chris Balderstone as amongst the best players that he played alongside.

Cloy was later a coach at Abbey Vale.

References

External links
George Cloy full career profile on the official Queen of the South website

1959 births
Living people
People from Stranraer
People from Kirkcudbright
Scottish footballers
Association football utility players
Kello Rovers F.C. players
Queen of the South F.C. players
Scottish Football League players
Footballers from Dumfries and Galloway
Association football fullbacks
Association football central defenders
Association football sweepers
Association football midfielders
Association football forwards